Paul Hutcheon is a Scottish political journalist who currently serves as Investigations Editor for the Sunday Herald. In 2006, while serving as political editor for the Sunday Herald, he won both Journalist of the Year and Political Journalist of the Year at the Scottish Press Awards. He moved to the position of Investigations Editor in 2008.

References 

Scottish journalists